Road signs in Georgia are similar to the road sign system of other post-Soviet states that ensure that transport vehicles move safely and orderly, as well as to inform the participants of traffic built-in graphic icons. However, some road signs look a bit different from Soviet ones and closer to the European ones. These icons are governed by the Vienna Convention on Road Traffic and Vienna Convention on Road Signs and Signals.

Gallery

References
http://www.adcidl.com/pdf/Georgia-Road-Traffic-Signs.pdf

Georgia (country)
Road transport in Georgia (country)